Elizabeth Hall may refer to:

People
Elizabeth Barnard (1608–1670), née Elizabeth Hall, William Shakespeare's granddaughter
Elizabeth Hall (athlete) (born 1985), British cross country runner and steeplechaser
Elizabeth Blodgett Hall (1909–2005), academic administrator 
Elizabeth A.H. Hall, British professor of analytical biotechnology

Buildings
Elizabeth Hall (New Blaine, Arkansas), a historical building in New Blaine, Arkansas
Elizabeth Hall, a historic building on the campus of Stetson University in DeLand, Florida
Queen Elizabeth Hall, a music venue on the South Bank in London, often referred to as the "Elizabeth Hall"

Hall, Elizabeth